Japan competed at the 2008 Asian Beach Games held in Bali, Indonesia from October 18, 2008, to October 26, 2008. Japan finished with 3 gold medals, 3 silver medals, and 3 bronze medals. The country sent a total of 80 athletes, 59 men and 21 women.

Surfing is the most successful sport taking home 2 gold, 2 silver and bronze. Another amazing result was achieved by the Japanese women's national basketball team, they won a gold medal in beach basketball after beating Thailand in the final round. The triathlon collected one silver medal from Junichi Yamamoto. Meanwhile, beach wrestling collected one bronze medal from Kota Horaguchi.

Medallist

| width="56%" align="left" valign="top" |

|  style="text-align:left; width:22%; vertical-align:top;"|

Competitors

| width=78% align=left valign=top |
The following is the list of number of competitors participating in the Games.

Beach basketball
4 men
4 women

Beach handball
10 men
9 women

Beach volleyball
2 men
2 women

Beach wrestling
4 men

Bodybuilding
6 men

Dragon boat
21 men

Paragliding
4 men
2 women

Surfing
6 men
2 women

Triathlon
2 men
2 women

References 

Nations at the 2008 Asian Beach Games
2008
Asian Beach Games